Litjens is a Dutch patronymic surname most common in northern Limburg. Notable people with the surname include:

Joey Litjens (born 1990), Dutch motorcyclist 
Paul Litjens (born 1947), Dutch field hockey player
Pieter Litjens (born 1968), Dutch politician 
Stefan Litjens (1913–2002), German World War II pilot 
Thomas Litjens (born 1984), Dutch footballer

References

Dutch-language surnames
Patronymic surnames